scikit-learn (formerly scikits.learn and also known as sklearn) is a free software machine learning library for the Python programming language.
It features various classification, regression and clustering algorithms including support-vector machines, random forests, gradient boosting, k-means and DBSCAN, and is designed to interoperate with the Python numerical and scientific libraries NumPy and SciPy. Scikit-learn is a NumFOCUS fiscally sponsored project.

Overview
The scikit-learn project started as scikits.learn, a Google Summer of Code project by French data scientist David Cournapeau. The name of the project stems from the notion that it is a "SciKit" (SciPy Toolkit), a separately developed and distributed third-party extension to SciPy.
The original codebase was later rewritten by other developers. In 2010, contributors Fabian Pedregosa, Gaël Varoquaux, Alexandre Gramfort and Vincent Michel, from the French Institute for Research in Computer Science and Automation in Saclay, France, took leadership of the project and released the first public version of the library on February 1, 2010. In November 2012, scikit-learn as well as scikit-image, were described as two of the "well-maintained and popular"  . In 2019, it was noted that scikit-learn is one of the most popular machine learning libraries on GitHub.

Implementation
scikit-learn is largely written in Python, and uses NumPy extensively for high-performance linear algebra and array operations. Furthermore, some core algorithms are written in Cython to improve performance. Support vector machines are implemented by a Cython wrapper around LIBSVM; logistic regression and linear support vector machines by a similar wrapper around LIBLINEAR. In such cases, extending these methods with Python may not be possible.

scikit-learn integrates well with many other Python libraries, such as Matplotlib and plotly for plotting, NumPy for array vectorization, Pandas dataframes, SciPy, and many more.

Version history 
scikit-learn was initially developed by David Cournapeau as a Google Summer of Code project in 2007. Later that year, Matthieu Brucher joined the project and started to use it as a part of his thesis work. In 2010, INRIA, the French Institute for Research in Computer Science and Automation, got involved and the first public release (v0.1 beta) was published in late January 2010.
 August 2013. scikit-learn 0.14
 July 2014. scikit-learn 0.15.0
 March 2015. scikit-learn 0.16.0 
 November 2015. scikit-learn 0.17.0
 September 2016. scikit-learn 0.18.0 
 July 2017. scikit-learn 0.19.0
 September 2018. scikit-learn 0.20.0
 May 2019. scikit-learn 0.21.0
 December 2019. scikit-learn 0.22.0
May 2020. scikit-learn 0.23.0
 Jan 2021. scikit-learn 0.24
 September 2021. scikit-learn 1.0

scikit-learn tools
 mlpy
 SpaCy
 NLTK
 Orange
 PyTorch
 TensorFlow
 Infer.NET
 List of numerical analysis software

References

External links
 
 

Data mining and machine learning software
Free statistical software
Python (programming language) scientific libraries
Software using the BSD license